Hallescher FC, sometimes still called by its former name Chemie Halle, is a German association football club based in Halle an der Saale, Saxony-Anhalt. The club currently plays in the 3. Liga, the third highest level in the German football league system. For many years, Halle had been in East Germany's highest league, the DDR-Oberliga, up-until the German reunification. However, like many other teams from the former East, it then suffered the effects of economic and demographic decline in the region in the 1990s and fell down to amateur leagues. Since 2000, Hallescher FC has ended its downward trend and in the 2011–2012 season, they finally returned to a professional football league after 20 years of absence.

History

Origins (1900–1945)

The origins of the club can be traced back to Hallescher Fussball-Club Wacker 1900, founded in 1900 and generally referred to as Wacker Halle, which won the Saale district – named after the river Saale – of the Central German championship twelve times between 1910 and its last edition 1933. These are all to be considered championships of one of numerous German first divisions. Main rivals here were Hallescher FC and to a lesser extent Borussia Halle, Sportfreunde Halle and SV Halle 98.

Those title qualified for participation in the Central German Championships which Wacker won 1921 and 1928. In the ensuing play-off matches for the German Championship Wacker reached the semi-finals in 1921, there losing at home in front of a crowd of 12,000 1–5 to the later winners 1. FC Nürnberg. In 1928 10,000 saw a 0–3 quarterfinal exit versus FC Bayern Munich. In 1933–34 Wacker became first champions of the newly incepted central German division of the Gauliga. In the qualification group for the semi-finals of the national championship Wacker came with one win and five defeats last behind 1. FC Nürnberg, Dresdner SC and Borussia Fulda. In the next seasons Wacker finished second and seventh before being relegated as ninth. In 1941 the club managed to return and achieved third places in the first two seasons and eighth in 1944.

Background (1945–1954)
After World War II Wacker Halle was dissolved, like all German clubs, and in 1946 SG Halle-Glaucha (SG stands for "sports community", Glaucha is an inner neighbourhood) was formed. In 1948 the new club was renamed into SG Freiimfelde Halle, Freiimfelde being an inner eastern district. In April 1949 the footballers of Freiimfelde, after having won the championship of Saxony-Anhalt, joined ZSG Union Halle, the Central Sports Community of the People-Owned Enterprises of Halle. The team from Halle reached the final of the Soviet zone, winning the 1949 Championship of the Eastern Zone with a 4–1 victory over SG Fortuna Erfurt in front of 50,000 in the Ostragehege stadium of Dresden. 

Still in the same year ZSG Union became one of the founding members of the Oberliga, the first division of the German Democratic Republic, the state founded on 7 October 1949 on the territory of the Soviet zone. The team finished the first two seasons on fifth, respectively sixth spot.  After the first season the team played as BSG Turbine Halle. Attendance average in 1950–51 was just under 10.000.

In the season 1951–52 the average rose to 22,170 per match and Turbine won the championship of East Germany, ahead of SV Deutsche Volkspolizei Dresden and defenders BSG Chemie Leipzig. The form could not be retained and Turbine finished in 1953 on the 13th spot. Worse, after this season some of the most important players like Otto Knefler and coach Alfred "Fred" Schulz, who led the team to both championships, made off to West Germany in the context of the uprising of 1953 in East Germany. Nevertheless, in the 1953–54 DDR-Oberliga Turbine could improve to 8th position.

Sports clubs SC Chemie Halle-Leuna and SC Chemie Halle (1954–1966)
The East German authorities were motivated by the West German World Cup win 1954 in Switzerland to make improvements to football in their country. BSGs were transformed to "Sport Clubs", often part of major bodies of industry. 

Ths led to the foundation of SC Chemie Halle-Leuna on 18 September 1954 in Halle. A large part of the football department of BSG Turbine Halle was then transferred to the new sports club. SC Chemie Halle-Leuna was also given the spot in the DDR-Oberliga of BSG Turbine Halle. BSG Turbine Halle continued to exist, but forthwith played in lower leagues. SC Chemie Halle-Leuna exists as Hallescher FC these days. Both Turbine Halle and Hallescher FC claim the era between 1945 and 1954 as part of their history. 

SC Chemie Halle-Leuna was then merged with sports club SC Wissenschaft Halle to form the new sports club SC Chemie Halle on 30 June 1958.

Football club HFC Chemie (1966–1991)
 The team would be renamed Hallescher FC Chemie in 1966. The name change reflected  the separation of football departments from their parent sports clubs all across East Germany, forming football clubs, as sports bureaucrats strove to build a powerful national football team. The football department of SC Chemie Halle was separated from the sports club and re-organized as football club Halllescher FC Chemie on 26 January 1966. 

As SC Chemie Halle-Leuna the side won its first East German Cup in 1956, and a second one in 1962, this time as SC Chemie Halle. The club played in the premier DDR-Oberliga as a middling side, with the occasional lapse that would drop them to the second tier DDR-Liga. Their best result in this period was third place Oberliga finish in 1970–71 that earned them a first-round UEFA Cup appearance. After holding Dutch team PSV Eindhoven to a 0–0 draw at home, the team were caught in the Hotel 't Silveren Seepaerd fire ahead of the return leg, resulting in the death of midfielder Wolfgang Hoffmann and serious injury to several others. Halle withdrew from the competition immediately.

Play in reunified Germany (1991–present)
In 1991, after the last season of the DDR-Oberliga, they were placed 10th in the All-time DDR-Oberliga table. The club had also formed a significant number of players for the East Germany national football team, such as Dariusz Wosz and Bernd Bransch.

With German reunification in 1990, and the merger of the country's eastern and western leagues, the club entered the 2.Bundesliga as Hallescher FC, the second highest all-German league. However, a lot of important former players had already left the club for Western German or other European clubs and therefore in the 1991–1992 season, they finished second to last. Following this, they were relegated to the NOFV-Oberliga. However, this was only the beginning of a steady decline that followed and the club descended down to the Verbandsliga Sachsen-Anhalt (fifth level league) by the 1995–96 season.
The 1999–2000 season was a turning point for Halle, they finally returned to the NOFV-Oberliga where they stayed until 2008. In 2007, Sven Köhler became the team's manager and managed to secure a first place in the NOFV-Oberliga Süd 2007–2008. Hallscher FC was promoted to the Regionalliga Nord. They surprisingly finished their first Regionalliga season as a runner-up and only narrowly missed their second promotion within only two seasons. Finally, in the 2011–12 season, Hallescher FC managed to succeed in a neck-and-neck race with Holstein Kiel and RB Leipzig and was able to secure the first place. This meant a direct qualification for the 3. Liga and marked their return to a professional football league after a 20-year absence. Hallescher FC finished 3. Liga as 10th in 2012–13 and 2014–15 and as 9th in 2013–14 seasons.

Honours
 DDR-Oberliga
 Winners: 1949, 1952
 East German Cup
 Winners: 1956, 1962
 NOFV-Oberliga Süd (IV)
 Champions: 2008
 Regionalliga Nord (IV)
 Champions: 2012
 Central German football championship
 Champions: 1921, 1928
 Verbandsliga Sachsen-Anhalt (IV)
 Champions: 1997, 2000
 Saxony-Anhalt Cup (Tiers III–VI)
 Winners: 1994, 2002, 2008, 2010, 2011, 2012, 2015, 2016, 2019
 Runners-up: 2009, 2014, 2021

Players

Current squad

Notable former players
The following players represented the East Germany national football team whilst playing for Hallescher FC.

 Jens Adler
 Bernd Bransch
 Erich Haase
 Günter Imhof
 Erhard Mosert
 Frank Pastor
 Werner Peter
 Dieter Strozniak
 Klaus Urbanczyk
 Horst Walter
 Dariusz Wosz

Season-by-season record

References

External links

 
Abseits Guide to German Soccer

 
Association football clubs established in 1966
Football clubs in Germany
Football clubs in East Germany
Football clubs in Saxony-Anhalt
Sport in Halle (Saale)
1966 establishments in East Germany
Works association football clubs in Germany
2. Bundesliga clubs
3. Liga clubs
Sports team relocations